The 1983–84 New York Knicks season was the 38th season for the team in the National Basketball Association (NBA). In the regular season, the Knicks had a 47–35 record, and qualified for the NBA Playoffs as the fifth seed in the Eastern Conference. New York was led by small forward Bernard King, who averaged 26.3 points per game (PPG) in the regular season and 34.8 PPG in the playoffs. In early 1984, King scored 50 points in consecutive games, against the San Antonio Spurs and Dallas Mavericks.

In the opening round of the 1984 NBA Playoffs, the Knicks faced the Detroit Pistons. The teams split the first four games, as the Knicks won the first and third games. However, they were unable to clinch the series in Game 4, held in Madison Square Garden, their home arena. In the fifth and deciding game, held in Detroit's Joe Louis Arena, the Knicks held a 106–98 lead with less than two minutes remaining when Pistons point guard Isiah Thomas scored 16 points in a 94-second span. The game went into overtime, where New York won the game 127–123. King, despite playing with two dislocated fingers and the flu, scored 44 points in the game and 213 points in the series. His point total was the highest in NBA history by a player in a five-game series. After the Detroit series, the Knicks were matched with the Boston Celtics. In a seven-game series, the Celtics defeated New York.

Draft picks

Note: This is not an extensive list; it only covers the first round and notable post-first round picks.

Roster

Regular season

Season standings

z – clinched division title
y – clinched division title
x – clinched playoff spot

Record vs. opponents

Game log

Regular season

|- align="center" bgcolor="#ffcccc"
| 5
| November 5, 1983
| @ Golden State
| L 100–102
|
|
|
| Oakland-Alameda County Coliseum Arena
| 2–3
|- align="center" bgcolor="#ffcccc"
| 6
| November 8, 1983
|- align="center" bgcolor="#ccffcc"
| 8
| November 11, 1983
| San Diego
| W 116–95
|
|
|
| Madison Square Garden
| 4–4
|- align="center" bgcolor="#ccffcc"
| 11
| November 18, 1983
| @ Boston
| W 110–103
|
|
|
| Boston Garden
| 6–5
|- align="center" bgcolor="#ccffcc"
| 13
| November 22, 1983
| Boston
| W 117–113 (2OT)
|
|
|
| Madison Square Garden
| 8–5
|- align="center" bgcolor="#ccffcc"
| 16
| November 29, 1983
| San Antonio
| W 118–106
|
|
|
| Madison Square Garden
| 10–6
|- align="center" bgcolor="#ccffcc"
| 17
| November 30, 1983
| @ New Jersey
| W 113–104
|
|
|
| Brendan Byrne Arena
| 11–6

|- align="center" bgcolor="#ccffcc"
| 19
| December 3, 1983
| Houston
| W 117–101
|
|
|
| Madison Square Garden
| 13–6
|- align="center" bgcolor="#ffcccc"
| 21
| December 8, 1983
| @ Phoenix
| L 97–120
|
|
|
| Arizona Veterans Memorial Coliseum
| 13–8
|- align="center" bgcolor="#ccffcc"
| 22
| December 9, 1983
| @ San Diego
| W 111–92
|
|
|
| San Diego Sports Arena
| 14–8
|- align="center" bgcolor="#ccffcc"
| 23
| December 11, 1983
| @ Los Angeles
| W 109–98
|
|
|
| The Forum
| 15–8
|- align="center" bgcolor="#ffcccc"
| 24
| December 13, 1983
| Boston
| L 100–102
|
|
|
| Madison Square Garden
| 15–9
|- align="center" bgcolor="#ccffcc"
| 26
| December 17, 1983
|- align="center" bgcolor="#ccffcc"
| 28
| December 25, 1983
| New Jersey
| W 112–110 (OT)
|
|
|
| Madison Square Garden
| 17–11

|- align="center" bgcolor="#ccffcc"
| 32
| January 3, 1984
| Los Angeles
| W 117–105
|
|
|
| Madison Square Garden
| 18–14
|- align="center" bgcolor="#ffcccc"
| 36
| January 13, 1984
|- align="center" bgcolor="#ffcccc"
| 38
| January 17, 1984
| New Jersey
| L 115–121
|
|
|
| Madison Square Garden
| 21–17
|- align="center"
|colspan="9" bgcolor="#bbcaff"|All-Star Break
|- style="background:#cfc;"
|- bgcolor="#bbffbb"
|- align="center" bgcolor="#ccffcc"
| 43
| January 31, 1984
| @ San Antonio
| W 117–113
|
|
|
| HemisFair Arena
| 25–18

|- align="center" bgcolor="#ccffcc"
| 44
| February 1, 1984
| @ Dallas
| W 105–98
|
|
|
| Reunion Arena
| 26–18
|- align="center" bgcolor="#ccffcc"
| 45
| February 4, 1984
| @ Houston
| W 103–95
|
|
|
| The Summit
| 27–18
|- align="center" bgcolor="#ccffcc"
| 46
| February 6, 1984
| Golden State
| W 116–94
|
|
|
| Madison Square Garden
| 28–18
|- align="center" bgcolor="#ffcccc"
| 47
| February 8, 1984
|- align="center" bgcolor="#ccffcc"
| 48
| February 10, 1984
|- align="center" bgcolor="#ccffcc"
| 52
| February 18, 1984
| New Jersey
| W 112–102
|
|
|
| Madison Square Garden
| 33–19
|- align="center" bgcolor="#ffcccc"
| 57
| February 25, 1984
| @ New Jersey
| L 104–117
|
|
|
| Brendan Byrne Arena
| 33–24
|- align="center" bgcolor="#ccffcc"
| 59
| February 29, 1984
| @ Boston
| W 102–98
|
|
|
| Boston Garden
| 35–24

|- align="center" bgcolor="#ffcccc"
| 61
| March 3, 1984
|- align="center" bgcolor="#ccffcc"
| 63
| March 10, 1984
|- align="center" bgcolor="#ccffcc"
| 64
| March 13, 1984
| Phoenix
| W 117–96
|
|
|
| Madison Square Garden
| 39–25
|- align="center" bgcolor="#ffcccc"
| 68
| March 22, 1984
| Boston
| L 100–108
|
|
|
| Madison Square Garden
| 41–27
|- align="center" bgcolor="#ffcccc"
| 70
| March 25, 1984
| @ New Jersey
| L 94–107
|
|
|
| Brendan Byrne Arena
| 42–28
|- align="center" bgcolor="#ccffcc"
| 71
| March 27, 1984
| Dallas
| W 97–88
|
|
|
| Madison Square Garden
| 43–28

|- align="center" bgcolor="#ffcccc"
| 80
| April 11, 1984
| @ Boston
| L 96–102
|
|
|
| Boston Garden
| 46–34

Playoffs

|- align="center" bgcolor="#ccffcc"
| 1
| April 17
| @ Detroit
| W 94–93
| Bernard King (36)
| Bill Cartwright (11)
| Darrell Walker (7)
| Pontiac Silverdome14,127
| 1–0
|- align="center" bgcolor="#ffcccc"
| 2
| April 19
| @ Detroit
| L 105–113
| Bernard King (46)
| Truck Robinson (11)
| Ray Williams (9)
| Pontiac Silverdome14,275
| 1–1
|- align="center" bgcolor="#ccffcc"
| 3
| April 22
| Detroit
| W 120–113
| Bernard King (46)
| Bernard King (10)
| Rory Sparrow (10)
| Madison Square Garden16,354
| 2–1
|- align="center" bgcolor="#ffcccc"
| 4
| April 25
| Detroit
| L 112–119
| Bernard King (41)
| Truck Robinson (12)
| Rory Sparrow (10)
| Madison Square Garden18,205
| 2–2
|- align="center" bgcolor="#ccffcc"
| 5
| April 27
| @ Detroit
| W 127–123 (OT)
| Bernard King (44)
| Bernard King (12)
| Ray Williams (12)
| Joe Louis Arena21,208
| 3–2
|-

|- align="center" bgcolor="#ffcccc"
| 1
| April 29, 1984
| @ Boston
| L 92–110
| Bernard King (26)
| Truck Robinson (9)
| Rory Sparrow (6)
| Boston Garden14,890
| 0–1
|- align="center" bgcolor="#ffcccc"
| 2
| May 2, 1984
| @ Boston
| L 102–116
| Bill Cartwright (25)
| Bill Cartwright (11)
| Rory Sparrow (5)
| Boston Garden14,890
| 0–2
|- align="center" bgcolor="#ccffcc"
| 3
| May 4, 1984
| Boston
| W 100–92
| Bill Cartwright (25)
| King, Robinson (9)
| Rory Sparrow (10)
| Madison Square Garden19,591
| 1–2
|- align="center" bgcolor="#ccffcc"
| 4
| May 6, 1984
| Boston
| W 118–113
| Bernard King (43)
| Truck Robinson (9)
| Ray Williams (9)
| Madison Square Garden15,840
| 2–2
|- align="center" bgcolor="#ffcccc"
| 5
| May 9, 1984
| @ Boston
| L 99–121
| Bernard King (30)
| Bill Cartwright (10)
| Ray Williams (10)
| Boston Garden14,890
| 2–3
|- align="center" bgcolor="#ccffcc"
| 6
| May 11, 1984
| Boston
| W 106–104
| Bernard King (44)
| Bill Cartwright (14)
| Rory Sparrow (11)
| Madison Square Garden19,591
| 3–3
|- align="center" bgcolor="#ffcccc"
| 7
| May 13, 1984
| @ Boston
| L 104–121
| Bernard King (24)
| Truck Robinson (9)
| Ray Williams (7)
| Boston Garden14,890
| 3–4
|-

Player statistics

Season

Playoffs

Awards and records
Bernard King, All-NBA First Team
Darrell Walker, NBA All-Rookie Team 1st Team

Transactions

See also
1983–84 NBA season

References

New York Knicks seasons
New
New York Knicks
New York Knicks
1980s in Manhattan
Madison Square Garden